Harri Kullas (born 1 March 1992) is a Finnish-born Estonian professional Motocross racer. Kullas has had a long international career that has seen him compete in the FIM Motocross World Championship in both the MX2 and MXGP classes.

Kullas has competed at the Motocross des Nations 12 times, on the first four occasions for Finland and since 2014 for Estonia. As part of this, Kullas has been part of the Estonia teams that have recorded the highest overall finish ever for the nation – a pair of fourth places in 2015 and 2019.

Alongside this, Kullas has competed extensively in various national championships across Europe. In the UK-based MX Nationals series Kullas has taken the MX1 title three times as well as winning the overall Pro Fastest 40 ranking in 2022. In addition to this, Kullas has finished as runner-up to Tommy Searle in the MX1 class of the British Motocross Championship in 2021 & 2022. Kullas has also had second place finishes in the final overall standings in the ADAC MX Masters series and the Spanish Motocross Championship during his career.

In supercross, Kullas has won nine nights at the annual Tampere Supercross in Finland since 2012.

Career

Junior career 
In the first part of his career Kullas competed under the Finnish flag. He notably finished fourth in the 85cc class of the 2006 FIM Motocross Junior World Championship. The following season he stepped up to the 125cc class, culminating in him finishing in ninth overall in the 2007 FIM Motocross Junior World Championship.

250 career

Kullas stepped up again in 2008, this time up to the 250cc category aboard a KTM, competing at European level in the EMX2 class. He did not compete at every round of the series, but he did manage to record a third place finish in race one at the Finnish round. This culminated in a final championship position of 16th and alongside this he made his debut in the FIM Motocross World Championship by racing in the MX2 class at the final two rounds of the year. At the first of these in Lierop he recorded his first world championship points on debut. His performances were good enough for him to be selected for the Finnish team for that years Motocross des Nations at Donington Park. The team was able to finish in 11th overall and Kullas picked up the Ricky Carmichael award for the best individual young rider at the event.

For 2009 Kullas stayed in the EMX2 European Championship, missing four rounds but still finishing in sixth overall in the final standings. On the way to this, he would take his first race win in the series, which also resulted in his first overall round win at Schwedt in Germany. On the back of this, Kullas was signed to race in the MX2 class of the FIM Motocross World Championship full-time for 2010 by the Yamaha Gariboldi Monster Energy team. He was able to finish in eleventh in the final standings with several top-6 race finishes. After a second season with the team in 2011, where he as able to finish 9th in the final standings after missing the final two rounds, he switched to the Suzuki Europe squad for 2012. Unfortunately a knee injury obtained at the Swedish Grand Prix curtailed his season, resulting in an 18th in the final championship standings. Following this, Kullas returned to the Gariboldi team for 2013, who by this time was using Honda machinery. He had a good start to the season by finishing runner-up in the MX2 class of the annual pre-season Italian International Championship. However, at world championship level, Kullas' collaboration with the Gariboldi team ended after the Italian Grand Prix. Kullas finished the season with the Sahkar KTM team, achieving a final championship position of 15th.

During 2014 Kullas would begin to compete under the Estonian flag, making his Motocross des Nations debut for them that year. He remained with Sahkar KTM for that season, finishing in 18th in the MX2 World Championship standings after only competing in the European rounds of the series. 2015 would be Kullas' last year in the MX2 class, he started the season competing for the British-based Heads and all Threads Suzuki team – mainly concentrating on the British Motocross Championship. However, he would be called up to the factory Wilvo Nestaan Husqvarna team to replace the injured Aleksandr Tonkov mid-season. Kullas had an immediate impact, placing third in the second race at the Latvian Grand Prix – a result good enough to give him his first overall world championship podium. He finished the season by being part of the Estonia team that finished in 4th place at the 2015 Motocross des Nations, the highest finish ever for the country.

450 career
Kullas needed to move up to the MXGP category for 2016. He was able to sign a deal to ride for the German Sarholz KTM team, a deal that would see him compete at the European rounds of MXGP as well as the ADAC MX Masters series in Germany. He managed to finish in second in the final standings of the ADAC MX Masters championship, 12 points behind his teammate Dennis Ullrich. His part campaign in MXGP produced a best race finish of tenth in the first race at Valkenswaard, with 23rd in the final championship standings. The following season was again a part campaign in MXGP, with another tenth place (this time coming at race two in Assen) being the highlight.
 
2018 saw the focus for Kullas switch to mainly being on domestic championships in Europe. He rode the Spanish Motocross Championship in the Elite-MX1 class for the CSM Zambrana team, finishing as runner-up. He rode five MXGP rounds alongside this, with a best position of 15th. In 2019 this reduced to three MXGP appearances as he returned to the UK competition with the Cab Screens Honda team. The 2019 Motocross des Nations saw Kullas play a part in Estonia recording another fourth position overall, equalling the previous best result in 2015. Kullas has stayed with the Cab Screens squad in the UK since 2019, in the meantime picking up three MX1 titles in the MX Nationals championship as well as finishing runner-up in the 2021 and 2022 British Motocross Championship in the MX1 class. 

In 2022 Kullas competed as a replacement rider for the Gebben Van Venrooy team in MXGP for four rounds, holeshotting a race in Lommel.

Honours 
Motocross des Nations
 Team Overall: 2015 & 2019  4th
 Ricky Carmichael Motocross of Nations Youngest Rider Award: 2008 
ADAC MX Masters (Germany)
 Masters: 2016 
British Motocross Championship
 MX1: 2021 & 2022 
Spanish Motocross Championship
 Elite-MX1: 2018 
Italian International Motocross Championship
 MX2: 2013 
MX Nationals (UK)
 Pro Fastest 40: 2022 
 MX1: 2019, 2021 & 2022 
Finnish Motocross Championship
 MX1: 2021 , 2009 
 MX2: 2008 
 85cc: 2006 
Estonian Motocross Championship
 MX1: 2016  2014, 2017 & 2018 
 MX2: 2014 & 2017 
Tampere Supercross
 9 night wins

Career statistics

Motocross des Nations

FIM Motocross World Championship

By season

References

Living people
1992 births
Estonian motocross riders
Sportspeople from Helsinki